The BYD Dolphin is an all-electric subcompact hatchback produced by the Chinese manufacturer BYD Auto since 2021. It is due to be released as the EA1 and BYD Atto 2 outside of China.

Overview

During Auto Shanghai in April 2021, BYD presented a new generation of the platform dedicated to electric cars under the name e-Platform 3.0, which thanks to better weight distribution is to offer more efficient performance and range. At the same time, the Chinese manufacturer presented a pre-production prototype of the new city hatchback called BYD EA1 Concept, announcing not only a new range of electric cars, but also a modernized stylistic language and company logo.

The production model was presented three months later under the name BYD Dolphin. The car extensively recreated the look of a prototype, with a one-box silhouette and sharp shapes for a new generation of BYD car looks by design team head Wolfgang Egger. As announced, the car was the first production model to bear the new BYD brand logo.

In February 2022, BYD's Australian distributor, EVDirect, announced plans to sell the Dolphin in Australia with a target price of AUD$35,000-40,000 and a focus on ride-share operators.

The dimensions of the BYD Dolphin are 4,070/1,770/1,570mm (160.2/69.69/61.81in), with a 2,700mm (106.3in) wheelbase. The rear cargo space or trunk, totals 345l (12.2 cubic feet) that increases to 1310l (46.3 cubic feet) when the back seats are folded. In comparison, this is smaller than a Corolla sedan which has 13.1 cubic feet of trunk space, while a more fair comparison would be with the Corolla hatchback which offers 17.8 cubic feet.

References

Dolphin
Production electric cars
Cars introduced in 2021
Front-wheel-drive vehicles
Compact cars
Hatchbacks